Hurricane Alberto was a Category 1 hurricane that caused the worst flooding in western Cuba in 32 years. The first tropical storm and hurricane of the 1982 Atlantic hurricane season, Alberto developed from a tropical disturbance on June 2 in the southern Gulf of Mexico. It rapidly organized and attained hurricane status the following day, the earliest date for a hurricane in the Atlantic Ocean since Hurricane Alma in May 1970. Shortly after reaching peak winds off , Alberto rapidly weakened due to approaching upper-level winds. Initial forecasts predicted the hurricane would continue northeastward into Florida; it turned sharply westward and drifted erratically for several days across the eastern Gulf of Mexico, before dissipating on June 6.

Alberto produced heavy rainfall in western Cuba, causing flash flooding and severe damage. The storm damaged 8,745 houses and destroyed 154 buildings, leaving hundreds homeless. Heavy rainfall continued in the country for several weeks after the storm, and damage from Alberto totaled about $85 million (1982 USD$,   USD). At least 23 people were killed in the country. Initially, Alberto was forecast to continue northeastward and strike Florida, though it turned and rapidly weakened, resulting in minor effects in the state.

Meteorological history

In late May, a tropical disturbance gradually developed over the northwestern portion of the Caribbean. It drifted westward into the Yucatán Peninsula, and on June 1 the convection organized into a circular cloud pattern in association with a low pressure system. Reconnaissance Aircraft confirmed the existence of the tropical depression later that day. An Air Force flight was scheduled into the storm, though was forbidden by the Cuban government due to its presence in Cuban airspace.

Alberto quickly strengthened while moving northeastward through the southeastern Gulf of Mexico, and intensified into a hurricane about nine hours after attaining tropical storm status. Shortly after peaking in intensity, strong upper-level westerly winds impacted the deep convection of the storm. By early on June 4 Alberto weakened to a tropical storm after turning sharply westward due to weak steering currents. It drifted erratically as the circulation became exposed, and early on June 5 it degenerated into a convectiveless tropical depression.

Preparations and impact

Cuba
The rainbands of Alberto produced heavy rainfall and flash flooding across western Cuba. More than 50,000 were forced to evacuate from the resulting floods, which were described as the worst flooding in the northwestern portion of the country since 1950.

Hurricane Alberto damaged a total of 8,745 houses in the country. In Pinar del Río Province, 71 homes were destroyed, and across the nation hundreds of people were left homeless. 83 buildings were collapsed in the capital city of Havana, while six factories in Havana Province received damage. The passage of Alberto left several districts in Havana without electricity, telegraph, telephone, and mail service. The Cuban military was deployed to rescue those trapped in flooded homes and also to remove fallen trees. Agricultural damage included about 250,000 downed banana trees and 400 drowned cattle. Heavy rainfall continued for weeks after the passage of Alberto, resulting in severe damage to the tobacco crop. Subsequent winds and rains destroyed storage sheds which ruined 1.8 million lb. (900,000 kg) of the recently finished harvest; 2.6 million lb. (1.3 million kg) of tobacco leaves were also damaged. Two days after its closest approach, the death toll in Cuba reached 11, and a day later it was raised to 23 fatalities. The final death toll was reported as either 23 or 24, with one report indicating 17 people missing; Pinar del Río Province reported at least 20 deaths and Havana reported three casualties. Damage was estimated at $85 million (1982 USD$,   USD).

Florida

Due to its sudden development and project track into southwest Florida, the National Hurricane Center issued a tropical storm warning and hours later a hurricane warning from the Dry Tortugas to Marathon in the Florida Keys and along the southwestern coastline northward to Fort Myers. A hurricane watch was also issued from Marathon to Jupiter Inlet. At the time of the issuance of the hurricane warning, Alberto had been moving steadily northeastward; extrapolating its motion indicated a landfall on Key West within 12 hours and a mainland landfall at Key Largo within 24 hours. Additionally, most computer models predicted Alberto to continue northeastward across south Florida. Only one model, not available until later, suggested a weakness in steering currents that would prevent a Florida landfall.

Officials ordered mandatory evacuations along the southwest coast of Florida. More than 1,000 left their homes to stay in nine emergency shelters. Air Florida canceled all flights from Miami to Key West. Many residents in the lower Florida Keys were unable to evacuate to the mainland, with about 50 people in Key West evacuating to four emergency shelters set up in the city. Officials closed schools in Monroe County at midday on June 3 and also sent all nonessential city and county employees home.

Gale-force winds and heavy rainfall were reported in the lower Florida Keys; Key West reported  during a 24-hour period, with the maximum reported winds at a land station being  in the Dry Tortugas. Alberto spawned three tornadoes and a waterspout in the Florida Keys, one of which at Stock Island which damaged several boats. One of the three tornadoes picked up a moving car and lightly injured the driver. Another knocked down two telephone poles on the Overseas Highway, which resulted in an hour traffic delay. Damage from the tornadoes totaled $275,000 (1982 USD, $620,000 2010 USD).

See also

 Other storms of the same name
 List of wettest tropical cyclones in Cuba since 1963
 List of Florida hurricanes
 Tropical cyclone rainfall climatology
 Timeline of the 1982 Atlantic hurricane season

References

Alberto
Alberto (1982)
Alberto (1982)
Alberto (1982)
1982 natural disasters in the United States
1982 in Cuba
Alberto